Griot, also known as Brewz Bana, is a rapper from Basel, Switzerland. Formerly known as Mory, he released several records and mix-tapes, until he was finally signed by Universal Records, Switzerland.

Discography

As Mory
 1998 S'Rosebett (EP)
 1999 Dynamit (Mixtape)
 2000 Limited Edition (EP)
 2002 S neue Testament

As Griot
 2003 Fuck Off Tape - Mixed by Jake (Mixtape)
 2004 Game Over - Mixed by DJ Sweap (Mixtape)
 2004 Killer Tape - Mixed by DJ Sweap (Mixtape)
 2006 Strossegold - Mixed by several DJ's (1st official Album)

Singles
 2006 Movement
 2007 Innercity Blues (feat. Ginjah)

External links
 Griot at myspace
 Strosse gold

Swiss male rappers
Living people
Year of birth missing (living people)